Oogenesis, ovogenesis, or oögenesis  is the differentiation of the ovum (egg cell) into a cell competent to further develop when fertilized. It is developed from the primary oocyte by maturation. Oogenesis is initiated in the embryonic stage.

Oogenesis in non-human mammals

In mammals, the first part of oogenesis starts in the germinal epithelium, which gives rise to the development of ovarian follicles, the functional unit of the ovary.

Oogenesis consists of several sub-processes: oocytogenesis, ootidogenesis, and finally maturation to form an ovum (oogenesis proper). Folliculogenesis is a separate sub-process that accompanies and supports all three oogenetic sub-processes.

Oogonium —(Oocytogenesis)—> Primary Oocyte —(Meiosis I)—> First Polar body (Discarded afterward) + Secondary oocyte —(Meiosis II)—> Second Polar Body (Discarded afterward) + Ovum

Oocyte meiosis, important to all animal life cycles yet unlike all other instances of animal cell division, occurs completely without the aid of spindle-coordinating centrosomes.

The creation of oogonia
The creation of oogonia traditionally doesn't belong to oogenesis proper, but, instead, to the common process of gametogenesis, which, in the female human, begins with the processes of folliculogenesis, oocytogenesis, and ootidogenesis. Oogonia enter meiosis during embryonic development, becoming oocytes. Meiosis begins with DNA replication and meiotic crossing over. It then stops in early prophase.

Maintenance of meiotic arrest
Mammalian oocytes are maintained in meiotic prophase arrest for a very long time—months in mice, years in humans. Initially the arrest is due to lack of sufficient cell cycle proteins to allow meiotic progression. However, as the oocyte grows, these proteins are synthesized, and meiotic arrest becomes dependent on cyclic AMP. The cyclic AMP is generated by the oocyte by adenylyl cyclase in the oocyte membrane. The adenylyl cyclase is kept active by a constitutively active G-protein-coupled receptor known as GPR3 and a G-protein, Gs, also present in the oocyte membrane.

Maintenance of meiotic arrest also depends on the presence of a multilayered complex of cells, known as a follicle, that surrounds the oocyte. Removal of the oocyte from the follicle causes meiosis to progress in the oocyte. The cells that comprise the follicle, known as granulosa cells, are connected to each other by proteins known as gap junctions, that allow small molecules to pass between the cells. The granulosa cells produce a small molecule, cyclic GMP, that diffuses into the oocyte through the gap junctions. In the oocyte, cyclic GMP prevents the breakdown of cyclic AMP by the phosphodiesterase PDE3, and thus maintains meiotic arrest. The cyclic GMP is produced by the guanylyl cyclase NPR2.

Reinitiation of meiosis and stimulation of ovulation by luteinizing hormone

As follicles grow, they acquire receptors for luteinizing hormone, a pituitary hormone that reinitiates meiosis in the oocyte and causes ovulation of a fertilizable egg. Luteinizing hormone acts on receptors in the outer layers of granulosa cells of the follicle, causing a decrease in cyclic GMP in the granulosa cells. Because the granulosa cells and oocyte are connected by gap junctions, cyclic GMP also decreases in the oocyte, causing meiosis to resume. Meiosis then proceeds to second metaphase, where it pauses again until fertilization. Luteinizing hormone also stimulates gene expression leading to ovulation.

Human oogenesis

Oogenesis
Oogenesis starts with the process of developing primary oocytes, which occurs via the transformation of oogonia into primary oocytes, a process called oocytogenesis. From one single oogonium, only one mature oocyte will rise, with 3 other cells called polar bodies. Oocytogenesis is complete either before or shortly after birth.

Number of primary oocytes
It is commonly believed that, when oocytogenesis is complete, no additional primary oocytes are created, in contrast to the male process of spermatogenesis, where gametocytes are continuously created. In other words, primary oocytes reach their maximum development at ~20 weeks of gestational age, when approximately seven million primary oocytes have been created; however, at birth, this number has already been reduced to approximately 1-2 million per ovary. At puberty the number of oocytes decreases even more to reach about 60,000 to 80,000 per ovary, and only about 500 mature oocytes will be produced during a woman's life, the others will undergo atresia(degeneration).

Two publications have challenged the belief that a finite number of oocytes are set around the time of birth. The renewal of ovarian follicles from germline stem cells (originating from bone marrow and peripheral blood) has been reported in the postnatal mouse ovary. In contrast, DNA clock measurements do not indicate ongoing oogenesis during human females' lifetimes.
Thus, further experiments are required to determine the true dynamics of small follicle formation.

Ootidogenesis
The succeeding phase of ootidogenesis occurs when the primary oocyte develops into an ootid. This is achieved by the process of meiosis. In fact, a primary oocyte is, by its biological definition, a cell whose primary function is to divide by the process of meiosis.

However, although this process begins at prenatal age, it stops at prophase I. In late fetal life, all oocytes, still primary oocytes, have halted at this stage of development, called the dictyate. After menarche, these cells then continue to develop, although only a few do so every menstrual cycle.

Meiosis I
Meiosis I of ootidogenesis begins during embryonic development, but halts in the leptotene stage of prophase I until puberty. The mouse oocyte in the dictyate (prolonged diplotene) stage actively repairs DNA damage, whereas DNA repair is not detectable in the pre-dictyate (leptotene, zygotene and pachytene) stages of meiosis. For those primary oocytes that continue to develop in each menstrual cycle, however, synapsis occurs and tetrads form, enabling chromosomal crossover to occur. As a result of meiosis I, the primary oocyte has now developed into the secondary oocyte.

Meiosis II
Immediately after meiosis I, the haploid secondary oocyte initiates meiosis II. However, this process is also halted at the metaphase II stage until fertilization, if such should ever occur. If the egg is not fertilized, it is disintegrated and released (menstruation) and the secondary oocyte does not complete meiosis II (and doesn't become an ovum). When meiosis II has completed, an ootid and another polar body have now been created. The polar body is small in size.

Folliculogenesis

Synchronously with ootidogenesis, the ovarian follicle surrounding the ootid has developed from a primordial follicle to a preovulatory one.

Maturation into ovum
Both polar bodies disintegrate at the end of Meiosis II, leaving only the ootid, which then eventually undergoes maturation into a mature ovum.

The function of forming polar bodies is to discard the extra haploid sets of chromosomes that have resulted as a consequence of meiosis.

In vitro maturation

In vitro maturation (IVM) is the technique of letting ovarian follicles mature in vitro. It can potentially be performed before an IVF. In such cases, ovarian hyperstimulation isn't essential. Rather, oocytes can mature outside the body prior to IVF. Hence, no (or at least a lower dose of) gonadotropins have to be injected in the body. Immature eggs have been grown until maturation in vitro at a 10% survival rate, but the technique is not yet clinically available. With this technique, cryopreserved ovarian tissue could possibly be used to make oocytes that can directly undergo in vitro fertilization.

In vitro oogenesis
By definition it means, to recapitulate mammalian oogenesis and producing fertilizable oocytes in vitro.it is a complex process involving several different cell types, precise follicular cell-oocyte reciprocal interactions, a variety of nutrients and combinations of cytokines, and precise growth factors and hormones depending on the developmental stage. In 2016, two papers published by Morohaku et al. and Hikabe et al. reported in vitro procedures that appear to reproduce efficiently these conditions allowing for the production, completely in a dish, of a relatively large number of oocytes that are fertilizable and capable of giving rise to viable offspring in the mouse. This technique can be mainly benefited in cancer patients where in today's condition their ovarian tissue 
is cryopreserved for preservation of fertility. Alternatively to the autologous transplantation, the development of culture systems that support oocyte development from the primordial follicle stage represent a valid strategy to restore fertility. Over time, many studies have been conducted with the aim to optimize the characteristics of ovarian tissue culture systems and to better support the three main phases: 1) activation of primordial follicles; 2) isolation and culture of growing preantral follicles; 3) removal from the follicle environment and maturation of oocyte cumulus complexes. While complete oocyte in vitro development has been achieved in mouse, with the production of live offspring, the goal of obtaining oocytes of sufficient quality to support embryo development has not been completely reached into higher mammals despite decades of effort.

Ovarian aging
BRCA1 and ATM proteins are employed in repair of DNA double-strand break during meiosis. These proteins appear to have a critical role in resisting ovarian aging.  However, homologous recombinational repair of DNA double-strand breaks mediated by BRCA1 and ATM weakens with age in oocytes of humans and other species.  Women with BRCA1 mutations have lower ovarian reserves and experience earlier menopause than women without these mutations.  Even in woman without specific BRCA1 mutations, ovarian aging is associated with depletion of ovarian reserves leading to menopause, but at a slower rate than in those with such mutations.  Since older premenopausal women ordinarily have normal progeny, their capability for meiotic recombinational repair appears to be sufficient to prevent deterioration of their germline despite the reduction in ovarian reserve.  DNA damages may arise in the germline during the decades long period in humans between early oocytogenesis and the stage of meiosis in which homologous chromosomes are effectively paired (dictyate stage).  It has been suggested that such DNA damages may be removed, in large part, by mechanisms dependent on chromosome pairing, such as homologous recombination.

Oogenesis in non-mammals

Some algae and the oomycetes produce eggs in oogonia. In the brown alga Fucus, all four egg cells survive oogenesis, which is an exception to the rule that generally only one product of female meiosis survives to maturity.

In plants, oogenesis occurs inside the female gametophyte via mitosis. In many plants such as bryophytes, ferns, and gymnosperms, egg cells are formed in archegonia. In flowering plants, the female gametophyte has been reduced to an eight-celled embryo sac within the ovule inside the ovary of the flower. Oogenesis occurs within the embryo sac and leads to the formation of a single egg cell per ovule.

In ascaris, the oocyte does not even begin meiosis until the sperm touches it, in contrast to mammals, where meiosis is completed in the estrus cycle.

In female Drosophila flies, genetic recombination occurs during meiosis.  This recombination is associated with formation of DNA double-strand breaks and the repair of these breaks.
  The repair process leads to crossover recombinants as well as at least three times as many noncrossover recombinants (e.g. arising by gene conversion without crossover).

See also
Anisogamy
Archegonium
Evolution of sexual reproduction
Female infertility
Female reproductive system
Meiosis
Oncofertility
Oogonium
Oocyte
Origin and function of meiosis
Sexual reproduction
Spermatogenesis

References
Cho WK, Stern S, Biggers JD. 1974. Inhibitory effect of dibutyryl cAMP on mouse oocyte maturation in vitro. J Exp Zool.187:383-386

Bibliography
 Manandhar G, Schatten H and Sutovsky P (2005). Centrosome reduction during gametogenesis and its significance. Biol Reprod, 72(1)2-13.

External links
Reproductive Physiology

Developmental biology
Genetics
Human female endocrine system
Meiosis